Patricia A. "Pat" Davidson (born June 30, 1946 in Petrolia, Ontario) was a member of the House of Commons of Canada from 2006 until 2015 representing the riding of Sarnia—Lambton and is a member of the Conservative Party of Canada.

Davidson previously served as mayor of Wyoming (1991–2000) and Plympton-Wyoming, Ontario (2001–2006) and warden of Lambton County. She first won her seat in the 2006 federal election by defeating incumbent Liberal Roger Gallaway by more than 4,000 votes. Davidson was re-elected on May 2, 2011. She did not stand in the October 19, 2015 election.

She is married to Bill Davidson and has one son.

Davidson has publicly declared her opposition to the Canadian asbestos industry, which put her in disagreement with her party and then-Prime Minister Stephen Harper.

Electoral record

Sarnia—Lambton

Source: Elections Canada

 
Source: Elections Canada

Source: Elections Canada

External links 
Official website

1946 births
Conservative Party of Canada MPs
Members of the House of Commons of Canada from Ontario
Living people
Mayors of places in Ontario
Women mayors of places in Ontario
Women members of the House of Commons of Canada
21st-century Canadian politicians
21st-century Canadian women politicians